Guancha apicalis was thought to be  a species of calcareous sponge in the genus Guancha from Antarctica.  It actually never existed.

References

Guancha
Fauna of Antarctica
Animals described in 1931